The 2018 Overwatch League playoffs began on July 11, after the 2018 Overwatch League regular season ended, and concluded on July 28 with the 2018 Grand Finals, the first championship match of the Overwatch League (OWL). Six teams competed in the OWL Playoffs.

The winner of each round of the Playoffs was determined by a best-of-three match series, with match determined by best-of-five maps. The Quarterfinals had the third-seeded team playing the sixth-seeded team, while the fourth-seeded team played the fifth-seeded team. In the Semifinals, the top-seed team played the lowest remaining seed, while the second-seeded team played the next-lowest. The winners advanced to the Grand Finals, which took place at Barclays Center in Brooklyn, New York on July 27–28.

London Spitfire defeated Philadelphia Fusion in the Grand Finals to become the first Overwatch League Champions.

Map pool and rotation 
The postseason map pool consisted of eight maps, with a ninth map as the tie-breaking map (if necessary), and was decided by a lottery system on June 19.

Participants 
Six teams qualified for the Season Playoffs based on their season overall records. The two division leaders were awarded the top two seeds, and the following top four teams, regardless of division, were awarded seeds three through six.

Bracket

Quarterfinals

(3) Boston Uprising vs. (6) Philadelphia Fusion 
The Fusion pulled off a 2–1 victory in their first match against the Uprising, who had been high in the standings early in the regular season but had lost momentum in the latter half. Fusion used a tank-heavy roster, including Reinhardt played by Sado, which forced the Uprising to move away from their sniper-based strategy.  Fusion's Eqo and Carpe also showed skill across several heroes to help with the victory.

(4) Los Angeles Gladiators vs. (5) London Spitfire 
The Spitfire had been underdogs in their match against the Gladiators, having never won a regular season match against them. The Gladiators took the first match, 3–0, including a trick play that involved Surefour staying in the spawn room as a different hero until well into the match before changing to his regular Widowmaker hero and readily picking off the open Spitfire players. The Spitfire responded in the following matches with adaptive changes in their team composition that prevented the Gladiators from maintaining their defense lines. Notably, the Gladiators chose to bench their primary main tank player Fissure, who came second place for Season MVP, for the playoffs, opting instead to replace him with the team's other main tank player, . The official reason given for this decision was that "the Gladiators believe that the most effective practice and preparation is necessary in order to perform well in playoffs."

Semifinals 
After each quarterfinal series, the sixth-seeded Fusion, being the lowest seed of the two quarterfinals winners, faced the top-seeded Excelsior, whereas the fifth-seeded Spitfire played against the second-seeded Los Angeles Valiant. The semi-final saw upsets in both brackets with the lower-seed Fusion and Spitfire winning over the top seeds Excelsior and Valiant.

(1) New York Excelsior vs. (6) Philadelphia Fusion 
Fusion had taken the first series 3–0 over Excelsior. While the second set ran for all five maps, Fusion won the series and the spot in the Grand Finals.

(2) Los Angeles Valiant vs. (5) London Spitfire 
The Spitfire had kept their traction from the victory over the Gladiators in the previous round, and took their spot in the finals after two matches, winning each 3–1 and 3–0.

Grand Finals 

The London Spitfire defeated the Philadelphia Fusion in the Grand Finals series in 2 sets. The Spitfire's Jun-Young "Profit" Park was named the Grand Finals Most Valuable Player; Profit was observed to be a key offensive player in the series, in one match using Hanzo's ultimate ability to eliminate five of the six Fusion players.

Winnings 

Broadcast and viewership 
On the first day of the season playoffs, Disney and Blizzard announced a multi-year partnership that would bring the league and other professional Overwatch competitive events to ESPN, Disney XD, and ABC, starting with the playoffs and throughout all of the following season. The partnership marked the time that a live esports competition had aired on ESPN in prime time and the first time that an esports competition had aired on ABC. Nielsen ratings for the Grand Finals include a 0.18 rating (approximately 218,000 households) for the Friday match airing on ESPN, while the recap of the series airing on ABC on the Sunday after the event had a 0.3 rating (approximately 359,000 households). Blizzard estimated that over a million people were watching the Grand Finals at any time, between broadcast and streaming formats, with a total viewership of over 10.8 million.

Telecast schedule

References 

Overwatch
Playoffs
Overwatch League
Overwatch League